CQ may refer to:

Arts and entertainment
 CQ (film), a 2001 film
 La CQ, a Cartoon Network sitcom
 Cinémathèque québécoise, a Montreal film museum

People 
 CQ (playwright) or C. Quintana, a Cuban-American playwright, poet, and writer

Places
 Central Queensland (geographical division of Queensland)
 Chongqing, China (Guobiao abbreviation CQ)
 Northern Mariana Islands (FIPS Pub 10-4 or obsolete NATO digram CQ)

Publications
 CQ Amateur Radio
 CQ ham radio
 CQ Press, a US publisher in government and politics
The China Quarterly, a journal published by Cambridge University Press
 Congressional Quarterly, a US publishing company

Science and technology

 Conjunctive query, in relational databases and database theory
 CQ (call), in radio communications, a general call, to anyone who receives it
 Norinco CQ, a variant of the AR-15 rifle
 Cissus quadrangularis, medicinal plant from the grape family
 Adobe Experience Manager, formerly CQ, a web content management system

Other uses

 Cadit quaestio, Latin for "the question falls", in copy-editing means "has been checked"
 Carrier qualification, qualifications for modern US Navy carrier air operations
 Charge of Quarters, the military task of guarding the front entrance to a barracks
 Communication quotient, in business and organizational psychology
 Constellation Airlines (IATA airline designator CQ)
 Cultural Quotient, in business, education, government and academic research
 Knight of the National Order of Quebec (post-nominal letters CQ)